Runcorn railway station is located on the Beenleigh line in Queensland, Australia. It is one of two stations serving the Brisbane suburb of Runcorn, the other being Fruitgrove.

History
In 2008, an upgrade of the station was completed as part of the Salisbury to Kuraby triplication project. This included converting the eastern platform to an island, and a new footbridge with lifts.

Services
Runcorn is served by all stops Beenleigh line services from Beenleigh and Kuraby to Bowen Hills and Ferny Grove.

Services by platform

References

External links

Runcorn station Queensland's Railways on the Internet
[ Runcorn station] TransLink travel information

Railway stations in Brisbane